Samuel Watson Horner, III (born March 4, 1938) is a former American football halfback, defensive back, and punter in the National Football League for the Washington Redskins and the New York Giants.  He played college football at the Virginia Military Institute and was drafted in the second round of the 1960 NFL Draft. He is a 1956 graduate of The Hill School

Other Work
After Horner retired from the NFL, he attended the University of Georgia Veterinary School and earned a DVM degree. He practiced Equine Medicine and Surgery for 40 years in the Atlanta, Ga. area until his retirement in 2008. Sam was inducted into the VMI Sports Hall of Fame in 1973, and in 2000 he was the Georgia Equine Veterinarian of the Year.

References

1938 births
Living people
American football defensive backs
American football halfbacks
American football punters
New York Giants players
Sportspeople from Lawton, Oklahoma
Players of American football from Oklahoma
VMI Keydets football players
Washington Redskins players
The Hill School alumni